Yoʻldoshev (feminine Yoʻldosheva) is a surname. Notable people with the surname include:

 Akrom Yo‘ldoshev, Uzbekistani Islamist
 Lola Yoʻldosheva, Uzbekistani singer and actress
 Tohir Yoʻldoshev, co-founder of the Islamic Movement of Uzbekistan
 Nigmatilla Yoʻldoshev, Uzbekistani lawyer and politician

Uzbek-language surnames